Portarlington GAA is a Gaelic football club in Portarlington, County Laois, Ireland. 

Portarlington GAA have won 14 Laois Senior Football Championship titles, the most recent of which was in 2021.

Famous past players include Steve Allen, Colm Maher, Jim Mangan, Benny Hunt, Peter Murphy, Dermot Murphy, Seamus Hunt, Tom Smith, Adrian Phelan, David Sweeney, Hugh Emerson, Padraig O'Dwyer, Damien Ryan and Evin Bennett.

Current players of note include Cathal Ryan who played as a defender for the Laois senior team from 2004 until the end of the 2010/2011 season.

Achievements
 Laois Senior Football Championship: Winners (15): 1893, 1910, 1912, 1921, 1922, 1923, 1954, 1955, 1959, 1988, 1995, 2001, 2020, 2021, 2022

Notable players

Former players
 Steve Allen
 Colm Maher
 Jim Mangan
 Benny Hunt
 Seamus Hunt, involved in Laois's first Leinster final appearance for 13 years in 1981
 Dermot Murphy
 Brendan McCann
 Kevin McCann
 Peter Murphy
 Tom Smith
 Adrian Phelan
 David Sweeney
 Hugh Emerson
 Padraig O'Dwyer
 Damien Ryan
 Evin Bennett
 John Bolton

Current Panel
 Scott Osbourne
 Cathal Bennett
 Robert Piggott
 Alex Mohan
 Stuart Mulpeter
 Jason Moore
 Adam Ryan, Laois senior player
 Eoin McCann
 Keith Bracken
 Ronan Coffey
 Sean Byrne
 Rioghan Murphy
 Jake Foster
 David Murphy
 Colm Murphy
 Jack Whelan
 Colin Sleven
 Stephen O'Neill
 Daragh Galvin
 Cathal Ryan
 Jonathan Fullam
 Jordan Fitzpatrick
 Mikey Bennett
 Diarmuid Bennett
 Padraig Coffey
 Dean Foster
 Sean Michael Corcoran
 Conor McCarthy
 Sean Mooney
 Eoin Kennedy
 Ciaran Ward

Juvenile
Recent years showed an uptake in the amount of involvement shown by the club. With this involvement became great success. In recent years the Under 16 Laois league was won four times in a row with an under 17 and minor championship in 2014 and 2017.

McCann Park
McCann Park is the home of the Portarlington GAA club. The Laois senior inter-county team often train here, and it was the venue for the 1979 All-Ireland Senior Ladies' Football Championship Final replay, where Offaly defeated Tipperary. The Colm Maher memorial stand which is the main stand in the ground was built in the memory of Portarlington footballer Colm Maher who died on 2 June 1996. The stand has a capacity of 1,012 people (all seated).

References

External links
 Portarlington GAA Official Website
 Laois GAA Website

Gaelic games clubs in County Laois
Gaelic football clubs in County Laois
Portarlington, County Laois